Admiral Albert Gallatin Noble (December 14, 1895 – February 22, 1980) was a United States Navy admiral who was promoted to four star rank as a "tombstone admiral".

Biography
Noble was born in Preston, Texas to Albert G. and Sallie Wilson Noble. After graduating from Ardmore High School in Ardmore, Oklahoma, he received an appointment to the United States Naval Academy in 1913. He graduated and was commissioned an ensign on March 29, 1917, and was assigned to the battleship . In November 1921 he was accepted into Massachusetts Institute of Technology where in June 1923 he received a degree of Master of Science in mechanical engineering. After graduation, he joined the  In June 1924.

During World War II Gallatin was commander of Aitape Attack Force in April 1944, commanded a Naval Attack Group during the battle of Wakde in May 1944, and was Commander of Amphibious Group Eight, during operations against enemy forces in Mindanao and Balikpapan in mid-1945. Noble received the Navy Cross in 1944.

Gallatin was promoted to vice admiral on December 29, 1950, in charge of the Office of Naval Material. He retired on October 1, 1951, and was advanced to admiral based on his combat service.

Gallatin died in Washington, D.C., on February 22, 1980. He was married to Madeline Martin. They had one daughter. He was buried in the United States Naval Academy Cemetery.

See also

References

1895 births
1980 deaths
People from Grayson County, Texas
United States Navy admirals
United States Naval Academy alumni
MIT School of Engineering alumni
United States Navy personnel of World War I
United States Navy World War II admirals
Recipients of the Navy Cross (United States)
Recipients of the Navy Distinguished Service Medal
Recipients of the Distinguished Service Medal (US Army)
Recipients of the Legion of Merit
Burials at the United States Naval Academy Cemetery
Military personnel from Texas